Dušan Herda (born 15 July 1951) is a former Slovak football player. At age 11 he started to play in Jacovce and at 17, in 1962, he transferred to Slavia Prague (1969–1980). He also played for Dukla Praha (1980–1982) and Bohemians Praha (1982–1985).

Career
During his club career he played for Slavia Prague. He earned 2 caps for the Czechoslovakia national football team, and was part of the championship-winning team at the 1976 UEFA European Football Championship.

External links
 
 
 

1951 births
Living people
Slovak footballers
Czechoslovak footballers
Czechoslovakia international footballers
UEFA Euro 1976 players
UEFA European Championship-winning players
Bohemians 1905 players
SK Slavia Prague players
Dukla Prague footballers
Association football midfielders
People from Topoľčany District
Sportspeople from the Nitra Region